A vocational school, trade school, or technical school is a type of educational institution, which, depending on the country, may refer to either secondary or post-secondary education designed to provide vocational education or technical skills required to complete the tasks of a particular and specific job. In the case of secondary education, these schools differ from academic high schools which usually prepare students who aim to pursue tertiary education, rather than enter directly into the workforce. With regard to post-secondary education, vocational schools are traditionally distinguished from four-year colleges by their focus on job-specific training to students who are typically bound for one of the skilled trades, rather than providing academic training for students pursuing careers in a professional discipline. While many schools have largely adhered to this convention, the purely vocational focus of other trade schools began to shift in the 1990s "toward a broader preparation that develops the academic" as well as technical skills of their students.

Terminology

This type of institution may also be called a trade school, career center, career college, or vocational college.

By Region

Oceania

Australia
Vocational schools were called "technical colleges" in Australia, and there were more than 20 schools specializing in vocational educational training (VET). Only four technical colleges remain, and these are now referred to as "trade colleges". At these colleges, students complete a modified year 12 certificate and commence a school-based apprenticeship in a trade of their choice. There are two trade colleges in Queensland; Brisbane, the Gold Coast, Australian Industry Trade College and one in Adelaide, St. Patrick's Technical College, and another in Perth, Australian Trades College.

In Queensland, students can also undertake VET at private and public high schools instead of studying for their overall position (OP), which is a tertiary entrance score. However these students usually undertake more limited vocational education of one day per week whereas in the trade colleges the training is longer.

North America

Canada

Education in Canada is a provincial responsibility, and education evolved independently in each province, much like separate countries.
Vocational School is an old antiquated term that was previously used until the late 1960s when the education system evolved from basic primary education to include High School and then technical schools or colleges in the mid 1960s.  In the past (pre mid 1960s) some provinces Vocational schools in Western Canada were sometimes called "colleges" in Canada. However, a college may also refer to an institution that offers part of a university degree, or credits that may be transferred to a university.

In Ontario Technical schools like Central Technical School in Toronto, which was started in the late 1800s to train workers in the evening, eventually evolved into high schools when the education system was extended to high school level. When the public education system was expanded in the by the early 1920s high school level education was provided in Technical / Commercial Schools or Collegiate Institutes in a hybrid high school/ college level like situation. In Ontario prior to the mid 1960s a Vocational School was a trades or job training school that provided training in a very focused trades related area, and these were started in the early 1950s, and the few that existed were merged as departments of the Community colleges that were established starting in the mid 1960s .

Secondary schools had evolved into three separated streams: technical schools, commercial and collegiates (the academic schools). By the mid 1960s in suburban areas purpose built High Schools for slow learners or individuals that were being trained for jobs after high school was also termed "vocational schools". By the early late 1960s many of the technical and commercial school programs in large populated areas like around Toronto, were being merged or had purpose built combined schools were being built. While the schools still exist, the curriculum has changed so that no matter which type of school one attends, they can still attend any post-secondary institution and still study a variety of subjects and others (either academic or practical). In Ontario, the Ministry of Training, Colleges and Universities divided post-secondary education into universities, community colleges and private career colleges.

In the Province of Quebec, there are some vocational programs offered at institutions called CEGEPs (collège d'enseignement général et professionnel), but these too may function as an introduction to university. Generally, students complete two years at a CEGEP directly out of high school, and then complete three years at a university (rather than the usual four), to earn an undergraduate degree. Alternatively, some CEGEPs offer vocational training, but it is more likely that vocational training will be found at institutions separate from the academic institutions, though they may still be called colleges. Although many (if not most) vocational programs are in high school.

United States

In the United States, there is a very large difference between career college and vocational college. The term career college is generally reserved for post-secondary for-profit institutions. Conversely, vocational schools are government-owned or at least government-supported institutions, requiring two full years of study, and their credits are usually accepted elsewhere in the academic world. In some instances, charter academies or magnet schools may take the place of the final years of high school.

Career colleges on the other hand are generally not government supported in any capacity, occupy periods of study less than a year, and their training and certifications are rarely recognized by the larger academic world. In addition, as most career colleges are private schools, this group may be further subdivided into non-profit schools and proprietary schools, operated for the sole economic benefit of their owners.

As a result of this emphasis on the commercialization of education, a widespread poor reputation for quality was retained by a great number of career colleges for over promising what the job prospects for their graduates would actually be in their field of study upon completion of their program, and for emphasizing the number of careers from which a student could choose.

Even though the popularity of career colleges has exploded in recent years, the number of government-sponsored vocational schools in the United States has decreased significantly.

The Association for Career and Technical Education (ACTE) is the largest American national education association dedicated to the advancement of career and technical education or vocational education that prepares youth and adults for careers.

Earlier vocational schools such as California Institute of Technology and Carnegie Mellon University have gone on to become full degree-granting institutions.

Central and Eastern Europe

In Central and Eastern Europe, a vocational education is represented in forms of (professional) vocational technical schools often abbreviated as PTU, technical colleges (technikum) and technical high school.
Vocational school (college)
Vocational school or Vocational college is considered a post-secondary education type school, but combines coursework of a high school and junior college stretching for six years. In Ukraine, the term is used mostly for sports schools sometimes interchangeably with the term college. Such college could be a separate entity or a branch of bigger university. Successful graduates receive a specialist degree.
PTU

PTUs are usually a preparatory vocational education and are equivalent to the general education of the third degree in the former Soviet education, providing a lower level of vocational education (apprenticeship). It could be compared to a trade high school. In the 1920-30s, such PTUs were called schools of factory and plant apprenticeship, and later 1940s - vocational schools. Sometime after 1959, the name PTU was established, however, with the reorganization of the Soviet educational system these vocational schools renamed into lyceums. There were several types of PTUs such as middle city PTU and rural PTU.
Technicum

Technical college (technicum) is becoming an obsolete term for a college in different parts of Central and Eastern Europe. Technicums provided a middle level of vocational education. Aside of technicums and PTU there also were vocational schools (Russian: Профессиональные училища) that also provided a middle level of vocational education. In 1920-30s Ukraine, technicums were a (technical) vocational institutes, however, during the 1930-32s Soviet educational reform they were degraded in their accreditation.
Institute
Institutes were considered a higher level of education; however, unlike universities, they were more oriented to a particular trade. With the reorganization of the Soviet education system, most institutes have been renamed as technical universities.

Southeast Europe
In ex-Yugoslavian countries (Croatia, Serbia, Bosnia and Herzegovina, Slovenia, Montenegro and North Macedonia) there are technical high schools that can have three or four years courses. If a person finishes three year course he will get a trade degree, or technician degree if he finishes four. After technical high school a person can go to university. In Croatia there are two types of universities where people can continue their education: Classical universities (Sveučilište) and Universities of applied sciences (Veleučilište). In Universities of applied sciences, after three years students get a bachelors degree like in classical university, and after 5 years they get a professional specialist degree.

Greece
In Greece vocational school is known as Vocational Lyceum (2006–Present), it was named Technical Vocational Lyceum (1985-1998). It is an upper secondary education school (high school) of Greece, with three-year duration. Some have a wide range of majors, others only a few majors. Vocational majors are in Electrical Installation, Electronics and Automation, Meganotronics, Ventilation and Air-Conditioning Cooling, Nursing, Hairdressing, Graphic Design,Food Technology, Dental Technology, Aesthetic and Makeup, and others.

Western and Northern Europe

Finland 

The Finnish system is divided between vocational and academic paths. Currently about 47 percent of Finnish students at age 16 go to vocational school. The vocational school is a secondary school for ages 16–21, and prepares the students for entering the workforce. The curriculum includes little academic general education, while the practical skills of each trade are stressed. The education is divided into eight main categories with a total of about 50 trades. The basic categories of education are
 Humanist and educational branch (typical trade: youth- and free-time director)
 Cultural branch (typical trade: artisan, media-assistant)
 The branch of social sciences, business and merchandise (typical trade: vocational qualification in business and administration)
 Natural science (typical trade: IT worker)
 Technology and traffic (typical trades: machinist, electrician, process worker)
 The branch of natural resources and environment (typical trade: rural entrepreneur, forest worker)
 The branch of social work, health care and physical exercise (typical trade: practical nurse)
 The branch of travel, catering and domestic economics (typical trade: institutional catering worker)

The vocational schools are usually owned by the municipalities, but in special cases, private or state vocational schools exist. The state grants aid to all vocational schools on the same basis, regardless of the owner. On the other hand, the vocational schools are not allowed to operate for profit. The Ministry of Education issues licences to provide vocational education. In the licence, the municipality or a private entity is given permission to train a yearly quota of students for specific trades. The licence also specifies the area where the school must be located and the languages used in the education.

The vocational school students are selected by the schools on the basis of criteria set by the Ministry of Education. The basic qualification for the study is completed nine-year comprehensive school. Anyone may seek admission in any vocational school regardless of their domicile. In certain trades, bad health or invalidity may be acceptable grounds for refusing admission. The students do not pay tuition and they must be provided with health care and a free daily school lunch. However, the students must pay for the books, although the tools and practice material are provided to the students for free.

In tertiary education, there are higher vocational schools (ammattikorkeakoulu which is translated to "polytechnic" or "university of applied sciences"), which give three- to four-year degrees in more involved fields, like engineering (see insinööri (amk)) and nursing. Having a vocational degree also qualifies person to apply to a university.

In contrast to the vocational school, an academically orientated upper secondary school, or senior high school teaches no vocational skills. It prepares students for entering the university or a higher vocational school.

Ireland

A vocational school in Ireland is a type of secondary education school which places a large emphasis on vocational and technical education; this led to some conflict in the 1960s when the Regional Technical College system was in development. Since 2013 the schools have been managed by Education and Training Boards, which replaced Vocational Education Committees which were largely based on city or county boundaries. Establishment of the schools is largely provided by the state; funding is through block grant system providing about 90% of necessary funding requirements.

Vocational schools typically have further education courses in addition to the traditional courses at secondary level. For instance, post leaving certificate courses which are intended for school leavers and pre-third level education students.

Until the 1970s the vocational schools were seen as inferior to the other schools then available in Ireland. This was mainly because traditional courses such as the leaving certificate were not available at the schools, however this changed with the Investment in Education (1962) report which resulted in an upgrade in their status. Currently about 25% of secondary education students attend these schools.

Netherlands

In the Middle Ages boys learned a vocation through an apprenticeship. They were usually 10 years old when they entered service, and were first called leerling (apprentice), then gezel (journeyman) and after an exam - sometimes with an example of workmanship called a meesterproef (masterpiece) - they were called meester (master craftsman). In 1795, all of the guilds in the Netherlands were disbanded by Napoleon, and with them the guild vocational schooling system. After the French occupation, in the 1820s, the need for quality education caused more and more cities to form day and evening schools for various trades.
In 1854, the society Maatschappij tot verbetering van den werkenden stand (society to improve the working class) was founded in Amsterdam, that changed its name in 1861 to the Maatschappij voor de Werkende Stand (Society for the working class). This society started the first public vocational school (De Ambachtsschool) in Amsterdam, and many cities followed. At first only for boys, later the Huishoudschool (housekeeping) was introduced as vocational schooling for girls. Housekeeping education began in 1888 with the Haagsche Kookschool in The Hague.

In 1968 the law called the Mammoetwet changed all of this, effectively dissolving the Ambachtsschool and the Huishoudschool. The name was changed to LTS (lagere technische school, lower technical school), where mainly boys went because of its technical nature, and the other option, where most girls went, was LBO (lager beroepsonderwijs, lower vocational education). In 1992 both LTS and LBO changed to VBO (voorbereidend beroepsonderwijs, preparatory vocational education) and since 1999 VBO together with MAVO (middelbaar algemeen voortgezet onderwijs, intermediate general secondary education) changed to the current VMBO (voorbereidend middelbaar beroepsonderwijs, preparatory intermediate vocational education).

South Asia

India

In India vocational schools are mainly run by the government under the guidance of the Ministry of Skill Development and Entrepreneurship. Courses offered by the Government of India are Udaan, Polytechnics, Parvaaz, National Rural Livelihood Mission, Industrial Training Institutes, Aajeevika mission of national rural livelihood, Craftsmen Training Scheme. The Skill India movement has empowered the standards of all these institutions. Apart from these the Central Board of Secondary Education (CBSE) has included many vocational subjects in their senior secondary education.

Southeast asia

Indonesia 

In Indonesia the "Vocational" oriented schools that were first established during the VOC era were the Academy of Shipping (Academie der Marine) in 1743 but were closed again in 1755.

When the VOC's power ended at the end of the 18th century the establishment of schools was continued by the Dutch East Indies Government based on heredity, nation and social status. The first school for European children was opened in Jakarta in 1817, then followed by various other schools. However, after more than two centuries of rule since the VOC era, it was not until 1853 that the Dutch established a vocational school, namely the Ambachts School van Soerabaia (Surabaya Carpentry School) which was intended for Indo and Dutch children, followed by a similar school in Jakarta in 1856. These two schools were run by the private sector. It was only in 1860 that the Dutch East Indies Government set up a Carpentry School in Surabaya for Europeans. For Indigenous children, until then there was no such school.

Apart from the Shipping Academy, which was founded in 1743, the Carpentry School in Surabaya, which was founded in 1853, was the first vocational school in Indonesia. If this school becomes a benchmark, then until now vocational schools in Indonesia have been one and a half centuries old.

Currently, vocational schools in Indonesia hold several programs including: Engineering Construction and Property Building Construction, Sanitation, and Maintenance

Road, Irrigation and Bridge Construction

Construction and Property Business

Modeling Design and Building Information

Geomatics and Geospatial Engineering Geomatics Engineering

Geospatial Information

Electricity Engineering Power Generation Engineering

Electrical Power Network Engineering

Electrical Installation Engineering

Industrial Automation Engineering

Refrigeration and Air Conditioning Engineering

Electrical Power Engineering

Mechanical Engineering Mechanical Engineering

Welding Technique

Metal Casting Engineering

Industrial Mechanical Engineering

Engineering Design and Machine Drawing

Metal Fabrication and Manufacturing Engineering

Aircraft Technology Airframe Power Plant

Aircraft Machining

Aircraft Sheet Metal Forming

Airframe Mechanic

Aircraft Electricity

Aviation Electronics

Electrical Avionics

Graphic Engineering Graphic Design

Graphics Production

Industrial Instrumentation Engineering

East Asia

Japan
They are a part of Japan's higher education system. There are two-year schools that many students study at after finishing high school (although it is not always required that students graduate from high school). Some have a wide range of majors, others only a few majors. Some examples are computer technology, fashion and English.

See also

References

External links
 Career College Association website
 Barry Yeoman, Scam Schools, Good Housekeeping
 Association of Career and Technical Education (ACTE)
 Paying for Vocational School
 Questions to Ask a Vocational School

Educational stages
Tertiary education
Types of university or college
Types of vocational school